Jean-Baptiste Clément (31 May, 1836, Seine – 23 February, 1903, Paris) was a French chansonnier, journalist, socialist activist and communard. He is mostly known for his work Le Temps des cerises, which is strongly associated with the Paris Commune.

Biography 
Clément was born in to the family of a wealthy miller. He left his family as a teenager and became a metal worker. He soon began to become active in socialist circles as a journalist and became associated with prominent activists such as Jules Vallès. In 1867 he had to flee to Belgium, where he published Le Temps des cerises later on.

He returned to Paris and continued his activism against the Second French Empire which eventually got him arrested and imprisoned in the  Sainte-Pélagie Prison. Clément was released after the after the Republican protests and abdication of Napoleon III. He became a member of the National Guard and participated in protests against the Government of National Defence.

After the proclamation of the Paris Commune he was elected to the Commune Council and fought in the defense barricades during the semaine sanglante.

After the fall of the Commune he managed to flee Paris and through Belgium he settled in Britain for a short time. He was sentenced to death in absentia and during this period lived clandestinely with his family in Montfermeil. He returned to Paris of the general amnesty of 1880.

Clément participated in the founding of the Revolutionary Socialist Workers' Party of Jean Allemane. He also a member of the Grand Orient de France.

Jean-Baptiste Clément died on 23 February, 1903 in Paris aged 66.

Selected songs 

 Au moulin de Bagnolet (1863)
 Le Moulin des larmes (1865)
 Le Temps des cerises (1866)
 La Semaine sanglante (1871)
 La Chanson du semeur (1882)
 Les Traîne-misère (1883)
 Aux loups (1884)
 La Grève (1893)
 En avant paysans ! (1900)
Dansons la capucine (1860-1870 ?)
Le Capitaine « Au mur »
La Marjolaine
Bonjour printemps
Quatre-vingt-neuf
L'Eau va toujours à la rivière
Fournaise
Ah le joli temps !
Le Chasse neige
Le Bonheur des champs
Le Couteau de Jeannette
Fille des champs
Le Barde Gaulois
J'n'en ai pas le courage
Le Chant du ruisseau
Je vais chez la meunière

References 

1836 births
1903 deaths
Communards
French songwriters
Male songwriters
19th-century French poets
Revolutionary Socialist Workers' Party (France) politicians
French socialists
French Freemasons
People of Montmartre
Burials at Père Lachaise Cemetery